Mamelodi Sundowns Football Club (simply known as Sundowns) is a South African professional football club based in Mamelodi,  Pretoria in the Gauteng province that plays in the Premier Soccer League, the first tier of South African football league system. Founded in the 1970s, the team plays its home games in the Loftus Versfeld Stadium.

Sundowns have won the Premier League title a record 12 times since its inception in 1996, hold the joint record of 3 National Soccer League Championships and have won 15 league titles in total. It is currently the most successful football club in the South African PSL era. They won the 2016 CAF Champions League, 2017 CAF Super Cup and were voted the 2016 CAF Club of the Year. Domestically, they have also won the Nedbank Cup six times, the MTN 8 four times and the Telkom Knockout four times. They are the first South African team to compete in the FIFA Club World Cup, where they finished in 6th place.

Sundowns is owned by South African business magnate Patrice Motsepe and is one of the most valuable clubs in Africa, by market value. The club takes pride in its unique style of attacking play, locally dubbed "Shoe Shine & Piano" which includes combinations of quick, short passes on the ground and this is likened to the Spanish Tiki-taka. Over the years, this style of play has been reflected in its Youth teams and Women's football team. In 2021, Sundowns became the first club in Africa to win both CAF Champions League and CAF Women's Champions League titles.

History
Mamelodi Sundowns Football Club originated around Marabastad, a cosmopolitan area north west of the Pretoria CBD.

The club was originally formed in the early 1960s by a group of friends ( Philanthropist and Businessman Fish Kekana, Dr. Motsiri Itsweng and Dr. Bonnie Sebotsane) among whom were  an official football club in 1970.

The club was affiliated to the Federation Professional Football League in 1973 and in the same year reached the finals of the Coca-Cola Cup, where they played against Berea United and lost 5–3.

In 1978, the Federation Professional League threw their weight behind the then National Professional Football League. This meant the end of the Federation Professional League and the subsequent relegation of Sundowns to the second division.

For five years 'Downs battled to gain promotion and during that period the Sundowns' management resolved to disband the club, but instead the club relocated to Mamelodi in the early 1980s.

In 1985, South African football was the first sport to become non-racial and the National Soccer League was formed, incorporating the top clubs in the country.

Sundowns earned promotion to the NPSL in 1983, but in their first season in top-flight football, they found the going difficult until new owner Zola Mahobe came on board in 1985 and appointed Ben Segale as their coach. Under Mahobe, Sundowns fortunes changed for the better as they began to challenge for top honours in the domestic league. The big spending Sundowns boss recruited the services of elite South African footballers on a quest for supremacy, and changed their kit to resemble that of the Brazilian national team, earning them their nickname, "the Brazilians". Mahobe went to Soweto to acquire the services of the highly rated coach Stanley "Screamer" Tshabalala, who was assisting Blackpool at the time, to lead the ambitious Sundowns team. Under the tutelage of Screamer Tshabalala, Sundowns played an entertaining and effective brand of football which became known as "The Shoe Shine and Piano" and won various major trophies in the process to cement the club as one of the powerhouse of the South African football.

In 1988, the ownership of the club fell into the hands of Standard Bank, which repossessed the club from Zola Mahobe. The club went into liquidation and the football family Angelo and Natasha Tsichlas spoke to the bank and saved the club. They then formed a company with Abe Krok and bought 100% of the club. Under the Tsichlas/Krok leadership Sundowns became the best  team in South Africa. They won the first NSL League Trophy with Angelo Tsichlas as coach.

Premier Soccer League
National Soccer League was replaced by Premier Soccer League for the 1996–97 season. Sundowns won three consecutive titles from 1998 to 2000 as well as being Bob Save Super Bowl winners in 1998 and Rothmans Cup winners in 1999.

After dominating the local league by winning the league title three times in a row, Sundowns extended their focus to continental glory. In 2001, the club became only the second South African team to reach the prestigious CAF Champions League when they defeated Petro Atlético in the semifinals to reach their first continental cup final. The club reached the final of the 2001 CAF Champions League where they were defeated 4–1 on aggregate by Egyptian club Al Ahly.

Under Tsichlas, the team won more trophies than any other team in South Africa.

In 2004, mining magnate Patrice Motsepe bought a 51% share in the club and later took total control of the club by buying the remaining shares, thus becoming the sole owner and shareholder of the club. Under their new owner, Sundowns picked up their first piece of silverware for six years in May 2006 when co-coaches Miguel Gamondi and Neil Tovey oversaw Sundowns' triumph in the PSL, the seventh league title in their history.

After a slow start to the 2006–07 season, Gamondi and Tovey were relieved of their positions, and Gordon Igesund took over as head coach. Under Igesund, Sundowns defended their title in emphatic style, running away with the trophy. They failed to win the 'double', losing to Ajax Cape Town in the 2007 ABSA Cup final.

After a stuttering start to the 2009–10 season, an impressive run through the second half of the season saw the club to second position in the final league standings. The club nevertheless parted ways with coach Hristo Stoichkov.

In the 2010–11 season, Antonio Lopez Habas, who was the assistant coach under Stoichkov, took over the reins of the senior team. Sundowns made its best ever start to a League season and topped the league standings at the end of the first round. The second round of the league proved more competitive and Sundowns were in the hunt for the league title until the second last match. Habas resigned in February, citing personal reasons and went back to Spain. Assistant coach Ian Gorowa was appointed as interim head coach.

In 2011 highly rated Dutch tactician Johan Neeskens was appointed as the coach of Sundowns in a bid to awaken the sleeping giant that hadn't won silverware since winning the 2008 Nedbank cup. The Dutch-born coach gave a number of young players from the development team opportunities to impress in the senior team. Even though the Dutch mentor made the team play free-flowing and an entertaining brand of football, his failure to capture silverware led to his demise. In 2012, under the leadership of Neeskens, the club lost the 2012 Nedbank final 2–1 to Tshwane rivals Supersport United. His coaching stint at Chloorkop was short-lived as the impatient and demanding Sundowns supporters exerted pressure to the management to sack him. When the team failed to win the 2012 Telkom Knockout final against Bloemfontein Celtic, Neeskens got sacked as the head coach of the Tshwane-based side as the team was also languishing in the relegation zone.

On 2 December 2012, Pitso Mosimane took over as head coach and under his leadership Mamelodi Sundowns won the 2013/2014, 2015/2016, 2017/2018, 2018/2019 and 2019/2020  league titles. Mosimane oversaw the rise of Sundowns to win the CAF Champions League, which was the goal of owner Patrice Motsepe when he bought the club in 2004. In 2017, Sundowns became the second team in South Africa, after Orlando Pirates F.C., to win the CAF Super Cup by defeating TP Mazembe from the DRC.

On 4 March 2012, the team set a remarkable South African record in the Nedbank Cup when they beat Powerlines by a score of 24–0.

2016

Sundowns were eliminated in the preliminary rounds of the 2016 CAF Champions League, but were placed back in the competition after Congolese team Vita Club were disqualified from the competition for fielding a suspended player. In their journey for gold, Sundowns opened their campaign with an annulled 2–0 win against Algeria's ES Setif courtesy of Mabunda and Khama Billiat goals.

Despite the disappointment of losing 3 points, that did not halt their performance. On 26 June 2016, they faced Nigeria club Enyimba International F.C. in the Lucas Masterpieces Moripe Stadium. They defeated the Nigerians 2–1 with goals from Leonardo Castro and Wayne Arendse in the 42nd and 78th minutes, respectively. Their good form continued to Egypt, defeating Egyptian club Zamalek SC with a goal from Mabunda in the 17th minute, followed by an Ibrahim leveller in the 36th minute, prevailing with a 66th-minute goal from their star player Khama Billiat, which ended the match in favour of the Brazilians 2–1. They repeated this in the 2nd leg by beating the Egyptian club 1–0 with an own goal from Ali Gabr in the 79th minute. The win assured 'Downs a place in the semifinals, but they needed to end their group stage campaign on a high away against Enyimba. Playing with young players, 'Downs succumbed to their first defeat by 3–1 on a rainy slippery field.

In the semifinals, they faced Zambian team ZESCO United at the Levy Mwanawasa Stadium, where they lost to quick succession goals just a minute apart in the 54th and 56th minutes from Mwanza. Billiat netted a goal in the 86th minute to bring the score to 2–1, leaving 'Downs with much to do in the second leg. In the second leg, 'Downs did what was needed of them by winning the match 2–0, thanks to a goal from Liberian Anthony Laffor in the 5th minute and the young Percy Tau in the 64th minute. Mamelodi Sundowns F.C. reached the final of the competition for the first time since the 2001 CAF Champions League final (where they lost to Al Ahly SC). They also reached the 4th final for South African clubs (1 win and 2 losses).

In the final, they beat Egypt's Zamalek SC 3–1 on aggregate, claiming their first-ever continental title and becoming only the second South African team to be crowned champions of Africa.

Honours

 
  Shared record

Awards
African Club of the Year 2016
South African team of the year 2016
PSL team of the season 2015–16, 2013–14

Friendly cup competitions

Shell Helix Cup
Winners :   2018

Telkom Charity Cup
Winners(5) : 1991, 2000, 2004, 2005, 2006Carling Black Label Cup
Winners: 2022

Ohlsson's Challenge Cup
Winners : 1988

Performance in CAF Competitions
NB: South African football clubs started participating in CAF Competitions in 1993, after 16 years of being banned from FIFA due to the apartheid system. The ban extended from 1976 to 1992.
African Cup of Champions Clubs / CAF Champions League: 15 appearances
The club has 1 appearance in African Cup of Champions Clubs 1994 and 14 appearances in CAF Champions League from 1999 until now. It  has also recorded the biggest victory in the CAF Champions League by defeating Seychelles side Côte d’Or, 11–1 at home and 16–1 on aggregate in the first round of the 2019–2020 season.

CAF Confederation Cup: 4 appearances
CAF Super Cup: 1 appearance

CAF Cup: 2 appearances
African Cup Winners' Cup: 1 appearance

Note
 DNQ  - Did Not Qualify
 CAF announced on 24 May 2016 that Mamelodi Sundowns won on walkover after AS Vita Club were disqualified for fielding an ineligible player in their preliminary round tie against Mafunzo. Mamelodi Sundowns played in the Confederation Cup play-off round before they were reinstated to the Champions League.

Overall matches

CAF Association ranking for 2019/20

Legend
 CL: CAF Champions League
 CC: CAF Confederation Cup

Club ranking
Club ranking is used for seeding in the CAF competitions.

Legend

Performance in FIFA Club World Cup
FIFA Club World Cup: 1 appearance

Mamelodi was the first football club from Southern Africa to represent CAF in FIFA Club World Cup, following their 2016 CAF Champions League success.

Club records

Records

Source:

Premier Soccer League record

 Orange = In progress
 Gold = Champions
 Silver = Runner up

Management and staff

Technical team

Source:

Players

Shirt sponsor & kit manufacturer

References

External links
 
Premier Soccer League
PSL Club Info
South African Football Association
Confederation of African Football

 
Soccer clubs in Pretoria
Association football clubs established in 1970
Premier Soccer League clubs
1970 establishments in South Africa
CAF Champions League winning clubs
CAF Super Cup winning clubs